Lee McDermott (born 11 February 1974) is a male former British gymnast.

Gymnastics career
McDermott competed in seven events at the 1996 Summer Olympics. He represented England and won a gold medal in the rings and a bronze medal in the team event, at the 1994 Commonwealth Games in Victoria, British Columbia, Canada. Four years later he represented England and won a gold medal in the team event and a bronze medal in the horizontal bar, at the 1998 Commonwealth Games in Kuala Lumpur, Malaysia.

References

External links
 

1974 births
Living people
British male artistic gymnasts
Olympic gymnasts of Great Britain
Gymnasts at the 1996 Summer Olympics
Sportspeople from London
Gymnasts at the 1994 Commonwealth Games
Gymnasts at the 1998 Commonwealth Games
Commonwealth Games gold medallists for England
Commonwealth Games bronze medallists for England
Commonwealth Games medallists in gymnastics
20th-century British people
Medallists at the 1994 Commonwealth Games
Medallists at the 1998 Commonwealth Games